Kotla (citadel) may refer to:

Places

India
Kotla, Himachal Pradesh, a small hill town in Kangra district, Himachal Pradesh
Kotla Sultan Singh, a village in Amritsar district, Punjab State
Kotla, Punjab, a village in Jalandhar district, Punjab State
Kotla, Nuh, a village in Nuh district, Haryana
Malerkotla, an erstwhile Princely State & city in Punjab

Pakistan
Kotla, Bagh, a village and tourist resort in Azad Kashmir
Kotla Arab Ali Khan, a town in Gujrat District, Punjab
Kotla Mohsin Khan, a historic gate in Peshawar, Khyber Pakhtunkhwa
Kotla Musa Khan, a city south of Bahawalpur District, Punjab
Kotla tando, a village in Gujrat District, Punjab

Other places
Kotla, Poland, a village in Lower Silesia

Other uses
Kotla (surname)

See also
Feroz Shah Kotla, a 14th-century fortress in Delhi, India
Feroz Shah Kotla Ground, a cricket ground in New Delhi, India
Kotlas (disambiguation)
Kolta (disambiguation)